Mullsjö is a minor locality in Nordmaling Municipality, Sweden. It had 76 inhabitants in 2010.

References 

Populated places in Nordmaling Municipality